Kurt Büttner (14 February 1881, Leipzig - 1 April 1967, Zwickau)  was a
German entomologist who specialised in Heteroptera

Kurt Büttner was a physician.

Works
Partial list
Büttner, K. and Wetzel C (1904): Die Heleropterenfauna Westsachsens. Faun. Abh. Staatl. Mus. Tierkund. Dresden, H. 2, : 59-100.
Büttner, K. (1964): Beiträge zur Zikadenfauna von Westsachsen. Veröff. Naturk.-Mus. Zwickau 4, Sonderh. 2: 3-23.
Büttner, K. (1959): Die Tierwelt des Naturschutzgebietes Wulmer Hang bei Zwickau Veröff. Naturkundemus. Zwickau 3, Sonderh. 1: 1-40.

German entomologists
1881 births
1967 deaths
20th-century German zoologists